Madathumpady  is a village in Thrissur district in the state of Kerala, India. This village consist of 3 wards in poyya grama panchayat (7,8,9).

References

Villages in Thrissur district